State Route 321 (SR 321) is a north–south state highway located entirely in Hamilton County in southeastern Tennessee. It traverses mainly the eastern outskirts of Chattanooga, and its eastern suburbs.

Route description 
From the Georgia state line and the northern terminus of Georgia State Route 151, SR 321 begins a northerly course to intersect State Routes 320 and 317, the latter of which is located in Collegedale. Its northern terminus is at a junction with US 11/64 and SR 2 in Ooltewah. It is known as Ooltewah Ringgold Road for the majority of its length.

Major intersections

See also

References

External links
Tennessee Department of Transportation

321
321